The 2003 Cape Verdean Football Championship season was the 24th of the competition of the first-tier football in Cape Verde. Its started on 17 May and finished on 2 August. The tournament was organized by the Cape Verdean Football Federation. No club participated in the 2004 CAF Champions League or the 2004 CAF Winner's Cup.

Sporting Clube da Praia was the defending team of the title. A total of 11 clubs participated in the competition, one from each island league.

Overview 
The league was contested by 11 teams with Académico do Aeroporto winning the championship.

It was the first time that a total of 31 matches were played, 77 goals were scored

It would be the first time that two participants came from the island of Santiago and Santo Antão and they featured no single island championship match, they achieve two separate qualifications. Also it was the first participant of a club from Tarrafal, Amabox Barcelona and from Paul, Paulense. It was the only time that a participant of Fogo was outside the city of São Filipe, a club named Cutelinho.

Participants 

 Académica Operária, winner of the Boa Vista Island League
 Nô Pintcha, winner of the Brava Island League
 Cutelinho FC, winner of the Fogo Island League
 Onze Unidos, winner of the Maio Island League
 Académico do Aeroporto, winner of the Sal Island League
 Barcelona, winner of the Santiago Island League (North)
 CD Travadores, winner of the Santiago Island League (South)
 Paulense Desportivo Clube, winner of the Santo Antão Island League (North)
 Associação Académica do Porto Novo, winner of the Santo Antão Island League (South)
 FC Ultramarina, winner of the São Nicolau Island League
 Batuque FC, winner of the São Vicente Island League

Information about the clubs

League standings 
 Group A 

 Group B

Results

Final Stages

Semifinals

Finals

Statistics 
 Biggest win: Ultramarina 4-0 Onze Unidos (May 24)

Notes

Footnotes

External links 
 https://web.archive.org/web/20150924011016/http://www.fcf.cv/pt/
 https://web.archive.org/web/20160303175427/http://www.rsssf.com/tablesk/kaapv03.html

Cape Verdean Football Championship seasons
1
Cape